Treblecross is a degenerate tic-tac toe variant. The game is an octal game, played on a one-dimensional board and both players play using the same piece (an X or a black chip). Each player on their turn plays a piece in an unoccupied space. The game is won if a player on their turn makes a line of three pieces (Xs or black chips) in a row.

Gameplay 
The game begins with all the 1×n spaces empty. Each player plays an X on the one-dimensional board in an empty cell. The game is won when a player makes a row of three Xs.

See also

References 

Tic-tac-toe variants